Acantholipes trajecta is a species of moth in the family Erebidae first described by Francis Walker in 1865. It is found in South Africa, India, Sri Lanka, and Australia, where it has been recorded from Western Australia,
the Northern Territory and Queensland.

Description
The wingspan is about 28 mm. Body yellowish brown or dark red. The wings are blotchy brown. The forewings have a pale-edged submarginal line. Antennae of male minutely ciliated. Wings moderately broad. Body dark leaden grey. Forewings with indistinct waved antemdial and postmedial lines from the cell to inner margin with white specks series on them. The band runs from apex is reddish brown. Hindwings with reddish-brown narrow medial band, with indistinct antemedial and postmedial lines with series of white specks on them. A marginal series of dark specks present.

References

trajecta
Moths described in 1865
Moths of Asia
Moths of Africa
Moths of Australia